Sonja Pekkola (born 23 May 1993) is a Finnish badminton player. She started playing badminton since 10 years old at her hometown, then in 2012 she joined Finnish national badminton team. She won Finnish National Championships women's singles title in 2013, and six consecutive women's doubles title from 2014–2019. She won the international title at the 2016 Hellas Open in the women's doubles with Jenny Nyström.

BWF International Challenge/Series (1 title) 
Women's doubles

  BWF International Challenge tournament
  BWF International Series tournament
  BWF Future Series tournament

References

External links 

 

1993 births
Living people
Sportspeople from Espoo
Finnish female badminton players